The royal vole (Myodes regulus), also called the Korean red-backed vole, is a species of vole endemic to the Korean Peninsula. It lives underground in a burrow, emerging at night to feed on grasses, seeds and other vegetation. The International Union for Conservation of Nature has listed its conservation status as being of "least concern".

Taxonomy
It was later transferred to the genus Myodes, becoming Myodes regulus, but many authorities believed it was a subspecies of Myodes rufocanus. It has unrooted molar teeth, a characteristic shared by the very similar Myodes shanseius but not M. rufocanus, and molecular analysis shows that it is a distinct species.

Description
An adult royal vole weighs . The ears are large and are covered in short fur, and the body hair is fine and soft. The dorsal pelage is reddish-brown, the flanks greyish-brown and the underparts buffy-brown. The tail is bicoloured, dark above and pale beneath. Apart from the unrooted molar teeth, it can be distinguished from the grey red-backed vole by having a redder back, a more buffy (rather than greyer) underparts and a longer tail.

Distribution
The royal vole is endemic to the Korean peninsula. Its range includes all the southern parts of the peninsula as far north as the southern and western edges of the Kaema Plateau, where it gives way to the grey red-backed vole (Myodes rufocanus). It is not present in the extreme northeasterly part of North Korea. It occupies a range of habitats including mountain forests, bamboo woodland, scrub-covered hillsides, rocky slopes, rough grassland, cultivated land and river banks.

Ecology
The species is mainly nocturnal, and is herbivorous, foraging for plant material including grasses and seeds. It lives underground in a large and deep tunnel system that it excavates. This includes larder chambers for storing food and a nesting chamber lined with grasses, but not latrine chambers. It is a social species, issuing alarm calls to alert others to danger. Predators include foxes, martens, weasels, raccoon dogs, owls, birds of prey and snakes. Breeding takes place three to five times a year, with three or four young being born after a gestation period of 23 days.

Status
M. regulus is not facing any particular threats and is adaptable, so the International Union for Conservation of Nature has listed its conservation status as being of "least concern".

References

Bibliography 

Mammals of Korea
Myodes
Mammals described in 1907
Taxa named by Oldfield Thomas